The 1992 All-Pacific-10 Conference football team consists of American football players chosen by various organizations for All-Pacific-10 Conference teams for the 1992 college football season.

Offensive selections

Quarterbacks
Drew Bledsoe, Washington St.

Running backs
Napoleon Kaufman, Washington
Glyn Milburn, Stanford

Wide receivers
Sean Dawkins, California
Curtis Conway, USC

Tight ends
Clarence Williams, Washington St.

Tackles
Tony Boselli, USC
Lincoln Kennedy, Washington
Todd Steussie, California

Guards
Vaughn Parker, UCLA
Fletcher Keister, Oregon St.

Defensive selections

Ends
Chidi Ahanotu, California
Shante Carver, Arizona St.

Tackles
Rob Waldrop, Arizona

Linebackers
Ron George, Stanford
Dave Hoffmann, Washington
Brett Wallerstedt, Arizona St.
Willie McGinest, USC

Cornerbacks
Carlton Gray, UCLA
Kevin Miniefield, Arizona St. 
Keshon Johnson, Arizona

Safeties
John Lynch, Stanford
Eric Castle, Oregon

Special teams

Placekickers
Tommy Thompson, Oregon

Punters
Josh Miller, Arizona

Return specialists 
Curtis Conway, USC

Key

See also
1992 College Football All-America Team

References

All-Pacific-10 Conference Football Team
All-Pac-12 Conference football teams